General Butler may refer to:

Arthur H. Butler (1903–1972), U.S. Marine Corps major general
Benjamin Butler (1818-1893), American lawyer, major general during the American Civil War and later politician
Benjamin Franklin Butler (lawyer) (1795-1858), lawyer, legislator and Attorney General of the United States
Charles Butler, 1st Earl of Arran (1671-1758), Irish lieutenant general
David Butler (general) (1928–2020), Australian Army major general
Frederic B. Butler (1896–1987), U.S. Army brigadier general
George Lee Butler (born 1939), commander in chief, United States Strategic Command, and the last commander of Strategic Air Command
Hew Butler (1922–2007), British Army major general
James Butler (British Army officer) (died 1836), British Army lieutenant general
James Butler, 1st Duke of Ormond (1610–1688), Confederate Irish lieutenant general
James Butler, 2nd Duke of Ormonde (1665–1745), British Army general
John Butler (general) (c. 1728–1786), North Carolina Militia brigadier general during the American Revolutionary War
John G. Butler (inventor) (1842–1914), U.S. Army brigadier general
Lesley James Probyn Butler (1876–1955), British Army brigadier general
Matthew Calbraith Butler (1836-1909) Confederate States Army general in the American Civil War U.S. Army general in the Spanish–American War
Mervyn Butler (1913–1976), British Army general
Pierce Butler, 4th Viscount Ikerrin (c.1677–1711), Irish soldier who became a brigadier general under Queen Anne
Richard Butler (general) (1743-1791), American general during the Revolutionary War
Richard Butler (British Army officer) (1870-1935), British Lieutenant-General during the First World War
Richard Butler, 3rd Viscount Mountgarret (1578–1651), Confederate Irish general
Robert Butler (Virginia politician) (1784–1853), Adjutant General of Virginia in the War of 1812
Smedley Butler (1881-1940), major general in the U.S. Marine Corps
Stephen Butler (British Army officer) (1880–1964), British Army major general
William Butler (British Army officer) (1838–1910), British Army lieutenant general
William Butler (1759–1821) (1759–1821), South Carolina Militia major general
William Orlando Butler (1791-1880), American General during the Mexican War, U.S. Congressman and vice-presidential nominee

See also
General Butler (ship), a sailing canal schooner that sank in Burlington Bay, Vermont, in 1876
Attorney General Butler (disambiguation)